Delilah is a genus of longhorn beetles of the subfamily Lamiinae, containing the following species:

 Delilah gilvicornis (Thomson, 1868)
 Delilah subfasciata Dillon & Dillon, 1952

References

Onciderini